In the U.S. state of Mississippi, Interstate Highways are maintained by the Mississippi Department of Transportation (MDOT).


Primary highways

Auxiliary highways

See also

References

 
Interstate